WHEE is a Full Service formatted broadcast radio station licensed to Martinsville, Virginia, serving Martinsville and Henry County, Virginia.  WHEE is owned and operated by Martinsville Media, Inc. It has held the callsign WHEE since 1954.

References

External links
 AM1370 WHEE Online
 

1954 establishments in Virginia
Full service radio stations in the United States
Radio stations established in 1954
HEE
HEE